Ahmed I (18 April 1590 – 22 November 1617) was sultan of the Ottoman Empire from 1603 until his death in 1617. Ahmed's reign is noteworthy for marking the first breach in the Ottoman tradition of royal fratricide; henceforth, Ottoman rulers would no longer systematically execute their brothers upon accession to the throne. He is also well known for his construction of the Blue Mosque, one of the most famous mosques in Turkey.

Early life
Ahmed was probably born in 18 April 1590 at the Manisa Palace, Manisa, when his father  Mehmed was still a prince and the governor of the Sanjak of Manisa. His mother was Handan Sultan. After his grandfather Murad III's death in 1595, his father came to Constantinople and ascended the throne as Sultan Mehmed III.  Mehmed ordered the execution of his nineteen half brothers. Ahmed's elder brother Şehzade Mahmud was also executed by his father Mehmed on 7 June 1603, just before Mehmed's own death on 22 December 1603. Mahmud was buried along with his mother in a separate mausoleum built by Ahmed in Şehzade Mosque, Constantinople.

Reign
Ahmed ascended the throne after his father's death in 1603, at the age of thirteen, when his powerful grandmother Safiye Sultan was still alive. With his accession to the throne, the power struggle in the harem flared up;  Between his mother Handan Sultan and his grandmother Safiye Sultan, who in the previous reign had absolute power within the walls (behind the throne), in the end, with the support of Ahmed, the fight ended in favor of his mother, because his grandmother was too powerful and corrupt. A far lost uncle of Ahmed, Yahya, resented his accession to the throne and spent his life scheming to become Sultan. Ahmed broke with the traditional fratricide following previous enthronements and did not order the execution of his brother Mustafa. Instead, Mustafa was sent to live at the old palace at Bayezit along with their grandmother, Safiye Sultan. This was most likely due to Ahmed's young age - he had not yet demonstrated his ability to sire children, and Mustafa was then the only other candidate for the Ottoman throne. His brother's execution would have endangered the dynasty, and thus he was spared.

His mother tried to interfere in his affairs and influence his decision, especially she wanted to control his communication and movements. In the earlier part of his reign, Ahmed I showed decision and vigor, which were belied by his subsequent conduct. The wars in Hungary and Persia, which attended his accession, terminated unfavourably for the empire. Its prestige was further tarnished in the Treaty of Zsitvatorok, signed in 1606, whereby the annual tribute paid by Austria was abolished. Following the crushing defeat in the Ottoman–Safavid War (1603–18) against the neighbouring rivals Safavid Empire, led by Shah Abbas the Great, Georgia, Azerbaijan and other vast territories in the Caucasus were ceded back to Persia per the Treaty of Nasuh Pasha in 1612, territories that had been temporarily conquered in the Ottoman–Safavid War (1578–90). The new borders were drawn per the same line as confirmed in the Peace of Amasya of 1555.

Relations with Morocco 

During his reign the ruler of Morocco was Mulay Zidan whose father and predecessor Ahmad al-Mansur had paid a tribute of vassalage as a vassal of the Ottomans until his death. The Saadi civil wars had interrupted this tribute of vassalage, but Mulay Zidan proposed to submit to it in order to protect himself from Algiers, and so he resumed paying the tribute to the Ottomans.

Ottoman-Safavid War: 1604–06 

The Ottoman–Safavid War had begun shortly before the death of Ahmed's father Mehmed III.  Upon ascending the throne, Ahmed I appointed Cigalazade Yusuf Sinan Pasha as the commander of the eastern army. The army marched from Constantinople on 15 June 1604, which was too late, and by the time it had arrived on the eastern front on 8 November 1604, the Safavid army had captured Yerevan and entered the Kars Eyalet, and could only be stopped in Akhaltsikhe. Despite the conditions being favourable, Sinan Pasha decided to stay for the winter in Van, but then marched to Erzurum to stop an incoming Safavid attack. This caused unrest within the army and the year was practically wasted for the Ottomans.

In 1605, Sinan Pasha marched to take Tabriz, but the army was undermined by Köse Sefer Pasha, the Beylerbey of Erzurum, marching independently from Sinan Pasha and consequently being taken prisoner by the Safavids. The Ottoman army was routed at Urmia and had to flee firstly to Van and then to Diyarbekir. Here, Sinan Pasha sparked a rebellion by executing the Beylerbey of Aleppo, Canbulatoğlu Hüseyin Pasha, who had come to provide help, upon the pretext that he had arrived too late. He soon died himself and the Safavid army was able to capture Ganja, Shirvan and Shamakhi in Azerbaijan.

War with the Habsburgs: 1604–06 
The Long Turkish War between the Ottomans and the Habsburg monarchy had been going on for over a decade by the time Ahmed ascended the throne.  Grand Vizier Malkoç Ali Pasha marched to the western front from Constantinople on 3 June 1604 and arrived in Belgrade, but died there, so Sokolluzade Lala Mehmed Pasha was appointed as the Grand Vizier and the commander of the western army. Under Mehmed Pasha, the western army recaptured Pest and Vác, but failed to capture Esztergom as the siege was lifted due to unfavourable weather and the objections of the soldiers. Meanwhile, the Prince of Transylvania, Stephen Bocskay, who struggled for the region's independence and had formerly supported the Habsburgs, sent a messenger to the Porte asking for help. Upon the promise of help, his forces also joined the Ottoman forces in Belgrade. With this help, the Ottoman army besieged Esztergom and captured it on 4 November 1605. Bocskai, with Ottoman help, captured Nové Zámky (Uyvar) and forces under Tiryaki Hasan Pasha took Veszprém and Palota. Sarhoş İbrahim Pasha, the Beylerbey of Nagykanizsa (Kanije), attacked the Austrian region of Istria.

However, with Jelali revolts in Anatolia more dangerous than ever and a defeat in the eastern front, Mehmed Pasha was called to Constantinople. Mehmed Pasha suddenly died there, whilst preparing to leave for the east. Kuyucu Murad Pasha then negotiated the Peace of Zsitvatorok, which abolished the tribute of 30,000 ducats paid by Austria and addressed the Habsburg emperor as the equal of the Ottoman sultan. The Jelali revolts were a strong factor in the Ottomans' acceptance of the terms. This signaled the end of Ottoman growth in Europe.

Jelali revolts 
Resentment over the war with the Habsburgs and heavy taxation, along with the weakness of the Ottoman military response, combined to make the reign of Ahmed I the zenith of the Jelali revolts. Tavil Ahmed launched a revolt soon after the coronation of Ahmed I and defeated Nasuh Pasha and the Beylerbey of Anatolia, Kecdehan Ali Pasha. In 1605, Tavil Ahmed was offered the position of the Beylerbey of Shahrizor to stop his rebellion, but soon afterwards he went on to capture Harput. His son, Mehmed, obtained the governorship of Baghdad with a fake firman and defeated the forces of Nasuh Pasha sent to defeat him.

Meanwhile, Canbulatoğlu Ali Pasha united his forces with the Druze Sheikh Ma'noğlu Fahreddin to defeat the Amir of Tripoli Seyfoğlu Yusuf. He went on to take control of the Adana area, forming an army and issuing coins. His forces routed the army of the newly appointed Beylerbey of Aleppo, Hüseyin Pasha. Grand Vizier Boşnak Dervish Mehmed Pasha was executed for the weakness he showed against the Jelalis. He was replaced by Kuyucu Murad Pasha, who marched to Syria with his forces to defeat the 30,000-strong rebel army with great difficulty, albeit with a decisive result, on 24 October 1607. Meanwhile, he pretended to forgive the rebels in Anatolia and appointed the rebel Kalenderoğlu, who was active in Manisa and Bursa, as the sanjakbey of Ankara. Baghdad was recaptured in 1607 as well. Canbulatoğlu Ali Pasha fled to Constantinople and asked for forgiveness from Ahmed I, who appointed him to Timișoara and later Belgrade, but then executed him due to his misrule there. Meanwhile, Kalenderoğlu was not allowed in the city by the people of Ankara and rebelled again, only to be crushed by Murad Pasha's forces. Kalenderoğlu ended up fleeing to Persia. Murad Pasha then suppressed some smaller revolts in Central Anatolia and suppressed other Jelali chiefs by inviting them to join the army.

Due to the widespread violence of the Jelali revolts, a great number of people had fled their villages and a lot of villages were destroyed. Some military chiefs had claimed these abandoned villages as their property. This deprived the Porte of tax income and on 30 September 1609, Ahmed I issued a letter guaranteeing the rights of the villagers. He then worked on the resettlement of abandoned villages.

Ottoman-Safavid War: Peace and continuation 

The new Grand Vizier, Nasuh Pasha, did not want to fight with the Safavids. The Safavid Shah also sent a letter saying that he was willing to sign a peace treaty, with which he would have to send 200 loads of silk every year to Constantinople. On 20 November 1612, the Treaty of Nasuh Pasha was signed, which ceded all the lands the Ottoman Empire had gained in the war of 1578–90 back to Persia and reinstated the 1555 boundaries.

However, the peace ended in 1615 when the Shah did not send the 200 loads of silk. On 22 May 1615, Grand Vizier Öküz Mehmed Pasha was assigned to organize an attack on Persia. Mehmed Pasha delayed the attack till the next year, until when the Safavids made their preparations and attacked Ganja. In April 1616, Mehmed Pasha left Aleppo with a large army and marched to Yerevan, where he failed to take the city and withdrew to Erzurum. He was removed from his post and replaced by Damat Halil Pasha. Halil Pasha went for the winter to Diyarbekir, while the Khan of Crimea, Canibek Giray, attacked the areas of Ganja, Nakhichevan and Julfa.

Capitulations and trade treaties 
Ahmed I renewed trade treaties with England, France and Venice. In July 1612, the first ever trade treaty with the Dutch Republic was signed. He expanded the capitulations given to France, specifying that merchants from Spain, Ragusa, Genoa, Ancona and Florence could trade under the French flag.

Architect and service to Islam 

Sultan Ahmed constructed the Sultan Ahmed Mosque, the magnum opus of the Ottoman architecture, across from the Hagia Sophia. The sultan attended the breaking of the ground with a golden pickaxe to begin the construction of the mosque complex. An incident nearly broke out after the sultan discovered that the Blue Mosque contained the same number of minarets as the grand mosque of Mecca. Ahmed became furious at this fault and became remorseful until the Shaykh-ul-Islam recommended that he should erect another minaret at the grand mosque of Mecca and the matter was solved.

Ahmed became delightedly involved in the eleventh comprehensive renovations of the Kaaba, which had just been damaged by flooding. He sent craftsmen from Constantinople, and the golden rain gutter that kept rain from collecting on the roof of the Ka’ba was successfully renewed. It was again during the era of Sultan Ahmed that an iron web was placed inside the Zamzam Well in Mecca. The placement of this web about three feet below the water level was a response to lunatics who jumped into the well, imagining a promise of a heroic death.

In Medina, the city of the Islamic prophet Muhammad, a new pulpit made of white marble and shipped from Istanbul arrived in the mosque of Muhammad and substituted the old, worn-out pulpit. It is also known that Sultan Ahmed erected two more mosques in Uskudar on the Asian side of Istanbul; however, neither of them has survived.

The sultan had a crest carved with the footprint of Muhammad that he would wear on Fridays and festive days and illustrated one of the most significant examples of affection to Muhammad in Ottoman history. Engraved inside the crest was a poem he composed:

Character
Sultan Ahmed was known for his skills in fencing, poetry, horseback riding, and fluency in several languages.

Ahmed was a poet who wrote a number of political and lyrical works under the name Bahti. Ahmed patronized scholars, calligraphers, and pious men. Hence, he commissioned a book entitled The Quintessence of Histories to be worked upon by calligraphers. He also attempted to enforce conformance to Islamic laws and traditions, restoring the old regulations that prohibited alcohol, and he attempted to enforce attendance at Friday prayers and paying alms to the poor in the proper way.

Death

Ahmed I died of typhus and gastric bleeding on 22 November 1617 at the Topkapı Palace, Istanbul. He was buried in Ahmed I Mausoleum, Sultan Ahmed Mosque. He was succeeded by his younger half-brother  Mustafa as Sultan Mustafa I. Later three of Ahmed's sons ascended to the throne: Osman II (r. 1618–22), Murad IV (r. 1623–40) and Ibrahim (r. 1640–48).

Family

Consorts
Ahmed had two known consorts, plus  several unknown concubines, mothers of the other princes and princesses.  

The known consort are: 
 Kösem Sultan. His favorite, Haseki Sultan and probably legal wife, mother of many of his children. 
 Mahfiruz Hatun. Also called Mahfiruze, she was his first concubine and mother of the firstborn Osman II.

Sons
Ahmed I had at least thirteen sons:
Osman II (3 November 1604, Constantinople, Topkapı Palace – murdered by janissaries, 20 May 1622, Constantinople, Topkapı Palace, buried in Ahmed I Mausoleum, Sultan Ahmed Mosque), with Mahfiruz, Sultan of the Ottoman Empire;
 Şehzade Mehmed (11 March 1605, Constantinople, Topkapı Palace – murdered by Osman II, 12 January 1621, Istanbul, Topkapı Palace, buried in Ahmed I Mausoleum, Sultan Ahmed Mosque) with Kösem;
 Şehzade Orhan (1609, Constantinople – 1612, Constantinople, buried in Ahmed I Mausoleum, Sultan Ahmed Mosque) – maybe with Kösem.
 Şehzade Cihangir (1609, Constantinople – 1609, Constantinople, buried in Ahmed I Mausoleum, Sultan Ahmed Mosque).
 Şehzade Selim (27 June 1611, Constantinople – 27 July 1611, Constantinople, buried in Ahmed I Mausoleum, Sultan Ahmed Mosque) - maybe with Kösem.
 Murad IV (27 July 1612, Constantinople – 8 February 1640, Constantinople, Topkapı Palace, buried in Ahmed I Mausoleum, Sultan Ahmed Mosque), with Kösem, Sultan of the Ottoman Empire;
 Şehzade Hasan (25 November 1612, Constantinople – 1615, Constantinople, buried in Ahmed I Mausoleum, Sultan Ahmed Mosque).
 Şehzade Bayezid (December 1612, Constantinople – murdered by Murad IV, 27 July 1635, Constantinople, Topkapı Palace, buried in Ahmed I Mausoleum, Sultan Ahmed Mosque), maybe with Mahfiruz;
 Şehzade Selim (1613?, Constantinople – murdered by Murad IV, 27 July 1635, Constantinople, Topkapı Palace,  buried in Ahmed I Mausoleum, Sultan Ahmed Mosque), maybe with Kösem;
 Şehzade Süleyman (1613?, Constantinople – murdered by Murad IV, 27 July 1635, Constantinople, Topkapı Palace, buried in Ahmed I Mausoleum, Sultan Ahmed Mosque), maybe with Kösem;
 Şehzade Hüseyin (14 November 1614, Constantinople – 1617, Constantinople, Topkapı Palace, buried in Mehmed III Mausoleum, Hagia Sophia Mosque);
 Şehzade Kasım (1614, Constantinople – murdered by Murad IV, 17 February 1638, Constantinople, Topkapı Palace, buried in Murad III Mausoleum, Hagia Sophia Mosque), with Kösem;
 Ibrahim I (5 November 1615, Constantinople – murdered by janissaries, 18 August 1648, Constantinople, Topkapı Palace, buried in Mustafa I Mausoleum, Hagia Sophia Mosque), with Kösem, Sultan of the Ottoman Empire.

Daughters
Ahmed I had at least ten daughters: 
Ayşe Sultan (1605 or 1608, Constantinople – May 1657, Constantinople, buried in Ahmed I Mausoleum, Sultan Ahmed Mosque), with Kösem,
Fatma Sultan ( 1606, Constantinople – 1667, Constantinople, buried in Ahmed I Mausoleum, Sultan Ahmed Mosque), with Kösem;
Gevherhan Sultan (1605 or 1608, Constantinople –  1660, Constantinople, buried in Ahmed I Mausoleum, Sultan Ahmed Mosque), with Kösem,
Hatice Sultan (Constantinople, 1608 – Constantinople, 1610, buried in Ahmed I Mausoleum, Sultan Ahmed Mosque)
Hanzade Sultan (1609, Constantinople – 21 September 1650, Constantinople, buried in Ibrahim I Mausoleum, Hagia Sophia Mosque), with Kösem;
Esma Sultan (Constantinople, 1612 – Constantinople, 1612, buried in Ahmed I Mausoleum, Sultan Ahmed Mosque)
Zahide Sultan (Constantinople, 1613 – Constantinople, 1620, buried in Ahmed I Mausoleum, Sultan Ahmed Mosque)
Burnaz Atike Sultan (1614, Constantinople – 1674, Constantinople, buried in Ibrahim I Mausoleum, Hagia Sophia Mosque), maybe with Kösem;
Zeynep Sultan (Constantinople, 1617 – Constantinople, 1619, buried in Ahmed I Mausoleum, Sultan Ahmed Mosque)
Abide Sultan (Constantinople, 1618 – Constantinople, 1648), called also Übeyde Sultan, married in 1642 to Koca Musa Pasha.

Legacy
Today, Ahmed I is remembered mainly for the construction of the Sultan Ahmed Mosque (also known as the Blue Mosque), one of the masterpieces of Islamic architecture. The area in Fatih around the Mosque is today called Sultanahmet. He died at Topkapı Palace in Constantinople and is buried in a mausoleum right outside the walls of the famous mosque.

In popular culture
In the 2015 TV series Muhteşem Yüzyıl: Kösem, Ahmed I is portrayed by Turkish actor Ekin Koç.

See also
Transformation of the Ottoman Empire
 Abbas I's Kakhetian and Kartlian campaigns

References

External links

[aged 27]

1590 births
1617 deaths
Deaths from typhus
Modern child monarchs
Ottoman people of the Ottoman–Persian Wars
Infectious disease deaths in the Ottoman Empire
17th-century Ottoman sultans
Turks from the Ottoman Empire
Greeks from the Ottoman Empire
People from the Ottoman Empire of Greek descent